Munroe is a station on the Port Authority of Allegheny County's light rail network, located in Bethel Park, Pennsylvania. The street level stop is designed as a small commuter stop, serving area residents who walk to the train so they can be taken toward Downtown Pittsburgh. The stop straddles West Munroe Street so that stationary rail vehicles do not block the road. There is a small shelter for northbound passengers.

References

External links 

Port Authority T Stations Listings
Station from Munroe Street from Google Maps Street View

Port Authority of Allegheny County stations
Silver Line (Pittsburgh)